Northumbrian was an early steam locomotive built by Robert Stephenson in 1830 and used at the opening of the Liverpool and Manchester Railway (L&M). It was the eighth of Stephenson's nine 0-2-2 locomotives in the style of Rocket, but it introduced several innovations, which were also included Majestic, the last of the class.

Design

Northumbrian was the first 'locomotive' boiler that had both the firebox in a water jacket at one end and smokebox to collect ashes at the other.  Dawson describes it as the first of a "modern" (steam locomotive) boiler while Hollingsworth note virtually all successors followed this layout.

Other features included plate frames, a proper tender, and the cylinders set at a relatively low angle to the horizontal, giving smoother running.

Northumbrian suffered from a number of design aspects that were not optimal  The next iteration of locomotive development, one notable issue was while weight had increased from Rocket's 4 tons to over 7 tons weight distribution was more on the trailing wheels rather than the larger driving wheels which would be more useful for adhesion, and was one reason to move away from the  wheel arrangement. The successor Planet,  was to emerge shortly afterwards in the same year.

Service 
Northumbrian was handed over on 31 July 1830 at the price of £700, the cost being justified by more extensive use of copper and improved running characteristics. At the official opening ceremony of the L&M on 15 September 1830 with eight trains Northumbrian headed the first listed train with the Duke of Wellington as a prestige passenger and George Stephenson on the footplate.  Northumbian was offered to the London and Birmingham Railway for £450 in 1836, this was refused and it is possible the locomotive was broken up.

References 

 
 
  

Early steam locomotives
Steam locomotives of Great Britain
Railway locomotives introduced in 1830
0-2-2 locomotives
Locomotive boilers
Robert Stephenson and Company locomotives